The Siypantosh Rock Paintings are located throughout the southwestern portion of the Zarafshan mountains, Kashkadarya Region, Uzbekistan.

Site description
The rock paintings are situated on the concave rock faces of granite-diorite outcrops. Images were painted in black, yellow and red-brown pigments, and include foot-shaped designs, a bull with curved horns, various animals, small hand prints, among others.

World Heritage Status

References

Rock art in Uzbekistan
World Heritage Tentative List